Siagonyx is a genus of beetles in the family Carabidae, containing the following species:

 Siagonyx amplipennis Macleay, 1871
 Siagonyx blackburni Sloane, 1916
 Siagonyx mastersii Macleay, 1871

References

Licininae